Candymonium is a steel roller coaster located at Hersheypark in Hershey, Pennsylvania. Designed by Bolliger & Mabillard, the ride was announced in 2018 and opened on July 3, 2020. It is the tallest, fastest, and longest roller coaster at Hersheypark. It was introduced with a newly-themed section of the park called Hershey's Chocolatetown, adjacent to Hershey's Chocolate World.

History 
On October 3, 2018, Hershey Entertainment and Resorts revealed their "biggest announcement ever": a new  section of the park named Chocolatetown, as well as a new entrance plaza, both of which would open in 2020. The anchor attractions were scheduled to include a roller coaster, as well as a new shopping area and a fountain, built at a cost of $150 million. The FAA approved the ride.

In July 2019, Hersheypark officials announced that the new roller coaster would be called Candymonium, marketed as the "world’s sweetest coaster". According to Hershey Entertainment and Resorts Company CEO John Lawn, "the coaster was a key ingredient to the entire Hershey’s Chocolatetown". By that time, the first few track pieces and part of the station had been built.

In an Instagram post in October 2019, Hersheypark posted an image showing that construction on the lift hill was partially complete. In November 2019, Candymonium topped out when its lift hill was installed. The final track piece was installed in February 2020, though a opening date had not been announced at that time. Due to the COVID-19 pandemic in Pennsylvania, construction on Chocolatetown was delayed in April 2020, though construction resumed the next month and the first test train on Candymonium ran on May 6, 2020. Candymonium officially opened on July 3, 2020. Because of COVID-19 restrictions, only a limited number of guests were initially allowed in the park, and riders had to wear face masks while waiting for the ride (although they could take off their masks on the coaster).

Ride experience
After leaving the station, the train immediately ascends the  lift hill. Then, the train ascends and descends a  airtime hill over Spring Creek. After the hill, the track reverses direction via a 123-degree Hammerhead turn. Traveling over another camelback hill, there is a series of airtime hills as the track travels back above Spring Creek before making an upward helix to the right and a leftward bank. The train then travels over another airtime hill and down onto a 270-degree left turn. The train then dips slightly and then rises into trim brakes before curving to the right, downward and up into the final brake run.

Characteristics
The track is colored chocolate brown with light gray supports and contains seven camelback hills.

The three trains represent three Hershey's candies: Reese’s, Kisses, and Twizzlers. Each car seats four riders in a single row for a total of 28 riders per train.

Critical reception 
When Candymonium opened, Attractions Magazine wrote: "Candymonium is a hyper-coaster that lives up to that name, packing in thrills without leaving riders rattled." A reporter for LNP Always Lancaster wrote: "In many ways, Candymonium is the more refined cousin to Skyrush. [...] But whereas Skyrush is a ride I would not recommend to people who are skittish about roller coasters, Candymonium could be just what people hoping to overcome those fears are looking for due to a lack of loops and truly death-defying spins." The ride won a Golden Ticket Award from Amusement Today magazine in 2021, in which Candymonium was ranked as the 5th best steel roller coaster in the world.

References

External links

 

Hersheypark
Hypercoasters manufactured by Bolliger & Mabillard